Javier Valdivia Huerta (born 4 December 1941) is a Mexican former professional footballer who played as a forward for C.D. Guadalajara, Club Jalisco on a club level and Mexico internationally.

Career
Valdivia began playing football with local side Guadalajara in 1960. He made his debut with the Mexico national team in 1965.

He scored 2 goals in the 1970 FIFA World Cup, making him one of six Chivas players to score two goals at a World Cup final.

Career statistics

International goals
Scores and results list Mexico's goal tally first.

References

External links

1941 births
Living people
1970 FIFA World Cup players
C.D. Guadalajara footballers
Mexico international footballers
Footballers from Guadalajara, Jalisco
Association football midfielders
Mexican footballers
Liga MX players
CONCACAF Championship-winning players